An  is a kind of business in Japan that creates an identity viewed as socially respectable for peoples involved in occupations viewed as shameful, typically identities for women involved in the sex industry.  The fictitious identity is created to conceal the person's actual from her family, and potential spouses.  Services provided by alibi-ya range from simply a phone answering services at a non-existent employer to arrangements for a boss to give a speech at the client's wedding praising her work at the non-existent company. Though the business is not illegal of itself, alibi-ya came to attention in 2011 when fake documents issued by an alibi-ya were used to illegally obtain bank loans.

Etymology
"Alibi-ya" is a combination of the English world "alibi" and the Japanese "ya", meaning "shop" or "seller".

References

Sex industry in Japan